Lucie Madeleine Renaud (21 February 1900 – 23 September 1994) was a French actress best remembered for her work in the theatre. She did though appear in several films directed by Jean Grémillon including Remorques (Stormy Waters, 1941) and Lumière d'été (Summer Light, 1943).

Personal life

Renaud had a son, Jean-Pierre Granval (10 December 1923 – 28 May 1998), by her first marriage to Charles Granval. In 1940, Renaud married her second husband, actor-director Jean-Louis Barrault (1910 – 1994). They remained married until his death in 1994. She died the same year. The couple acted together and co-founded a number of theater companies, touring  extensively throughout North and South America.

Selected filmography

 Vent debout (1923)
 La Terre qui meurt (1927) - Roussille Lumineau
 Jean de la Lune (1929) - Marceline
 Serments (1931) - Maria
 Mistigri (1931) - Nell 'Mistigri' Marignan
 La couturière de Lunéville (1932) - Anna Tripied / Irene Salvago
 The Beautiful Sailor (1932) - Marinette
 La Maternelle (1933) - Rose
 The Tunnel (1933) - Mary Mac Allan
 Maria Chapdelaine (1934) - Maria Chapdelaine
 Helene (1936) - Hélène Wilfur
  The Strange Monsieur Victor (1938)
 Stormy Waters (1941) - Yvonne Laurent (as Madeleine Renaud de la Comédie Francaise)
 Summer Light (1943)
 The Stairs Without End (1943)
 The Woman Who Dared (1944) - Thérèse Gauthier
 Le Plaisir (1952) - Julia Tellier (segment "La Maison Tellier")
 Dialogue with the Carmelites (1960) - La première prieure
 The Longest Day (1962) - Mother Superior
The Devil by the Tail (1969)

References

External links
 
 
 

1900 births
1994 deaths
Actresses from Paris
Burials at Passy Cemetery
French stage actresses
Sociétaires of the Comédie-Française
French film actresses
French silent film actresses
20th-century French actresses